Prija is a female given name. It originates from Slavic mythology as the name of the goddess of good wishes.

It is similar in spelling and pronunciation to the Indian name Priya, a common given name in India and Nepal.

See also
List of most popular given names

References

External links 
Behind the Name
Baby Names.com
 
 

Slavic mythology
Czech feminine given names
Slovak feminine given names